Stockholm Syndrome (English: Stockholmský syndrom) is a 2020 Czech crime thriller miniseries directed by Dan Svátek. First part premiered on 12 January 2020 and was watched by 1,200,000 people. Second part premiered on 19 January 2020.

Cast
David Švehlík as Viktor Mojžíš
Martin Finger as Jindřich Osecký
Zuzana Mauréry as Helena Osecká
Elizaveta Maximová as Klára Osecká
Vojtěch Vondráček as Lukáš Kulhánek
Martin Pechlát as pplk. Taraba
Michal Čapka as Colleague 
Pavel Batěk as Mareš

References

External links
 
 Official website

2020s television miniseries
Czech Television original films
Czech crime television series
Czech thriller television series